Ricardo Mello (born 21 December 1980) is a Brazilian retired tennis player. His preference is for clay courts. He has had the occasional win in hard court tournaments. His best singles rank was No. 50 in 2005. He won one singles tournament (Delray Beach in 2004) and reached the semifinals three times at the Brasil Open. He played most of his tennis in Challenger tournaments, where he won 15 singles titles and three doubles titles.

Career

Early days
Ricardo was born in Campinas, Brazil and started to play tennis at the age of three. At 15, he drew a wild card into a tournament in his hometown. He lost to veteran and French Open winner Gustavo Kuerten. However, he gained his first ATP career points. In 1999, Ricardo won his first Futures events in Uruguay and Paraguay.

2004
Mello won his lone ATP title at Delray Beach, defeating Vincent Spadea in the final.

2006
At the Campbell's Hall of Fame Championships, Mello played top seed Andy Murray. Murray was in control of the first set, winning 6–1, but Mello won the second set 6–1. Mello took the third and final to a tiebreak, after having three match points. He lost in the tiebreak 5–7.

At the RCA Championships in Indianapolis, Mello faced Jean-René Lisnard in the first round and won in straight sets. In the second round, he faced 14th seed Vincent Spadea and lost.

Sponsorship
The sponsor for his clothes, shoes and racquets was Babolat.

ATP Tour Career Finals

Singles: 1 (1 title)

ATP Challenger and ITF Futures finals

Singles: 30 (21–9)

Doubles: 16 (3–13)

Grand Slam performance timeline

External links
 
 
 

Brazilian male tennis players
Sportspeople from Campinas
Living people
1980 births
Tennis players at the 2011 Pan American Games
Pan American Games competitors for Brazil